Yutaka Tsujinaka (born 1954) is a professor of political science and the Graduate School of Humanities and Social Sciences at the University of Tsukuba. He is now teaching at the College of Social Sciences and the doctoral program in International and Advanced Japanese Studies.  He is also the president of Japan Political Science Association, a member of the International Association of Universities (2012–2016), the director of Internationalization Subcommittee of IAU (2013–), the executive assistant to the President at University of Tsukuba (2013–) and the director of Institute for Comparative Research in Human and Social Sciences (ICR) (2014–).
Youji Inaba professor of economy at Nippon University said in a newspaper column that Professor Tsujinaka talks in friendly Kansai dialect and always gives everyone warm smile as if he has "Tender-Heated DNA" in his body.
(Nikkei: July 8, 2015)

Academic background
1972 Graduate from Kozu High School in Osaka
1976 LL.B Osaka University, School of Law
1978 LL.M. Osaka University, School of Law (Political Science)
1981 Completion of the coursework for doctoral program of Osaka University School of Law (Political Science)
1996 Doctor of Law (Political Science) Kyoto University

Positions and teaching career

2022–present  President of Toyo Gakuen University
2022–present  Visiting Professor, University of Tsukuba
2022–present  Part-time Lecturer, Tokai University
2019–2022  Vice chancellor for Arts and Humanities, Tokai University
2018–2022  Professor of Political Science, Tokai University
2014–2016 President of Japanese Political Science Association
2013–current Director of Institute for Comparative Research in Human and Social Sciences (ICR)
2013–current Executive Advisor to the President at University of Tsukuba
2013 current Chairman of Internationalization Subcommittee of IAU
2012–2016 current Administrative board member of International Association of Universities (IAU)
2011–2013 Headquarter Vice President at University of Tsukuba
2008–2011 Chair of  Doctoral Program in International and Advanced Japanese Studies
2003–2008 Manager of Special Research Project on Civil Society, the State and Culture in Comparative perspective
2001–2004 Dean of College of Social Sciences University of Tsukuba
1998–current Professor of Faculty of Humanities and Social Sciences at University of Tsukuba
1989–1991 Visiting Fellow: Cornell University East Asia Program and Department of Government
1986–1998 Associate professor of Institute of Social Sciences and Political Science at University of Tsukuba
1984–1986 Associate professor at Department of Law and Political Science, University of Kitakyushu
1981–1984 Assistant professor at Department of Law and Political Science, University of Kitakyushu

Academic societies
Japan Political Science Association
Association for Asian Studies
American Political Science Association
 Japan NPO Research Association
Public Policy Studies Association 
Japan Association For Comparative Politics

Honors and awards
2010 Japan NPO Research Association Award
2010 Best Faculty member 2009
1995 Okinaga Award
1990 American Council of Learned Societies Award
1989 Fulbright Award

Research projects
2016- current    "Comparative Study on Local Governance　(State / Civil Society Relations) in Japan and Asia"
2010–2015 "A Comparative and Empirical Study of the Structural Change in Politics and Transformations in Pressure Groups, Policy Networks, and Civil Society in Japan since 2009"
2005–2010 "A Comprehensive Empirical Study on the Three-Level Civil Society Structure and Governance in Japan, South Korea, the United States, Germany, and China in Comparative Perspective"
2002–2005 "A Systematic and Comparative Study on Public Policy and Policy-Making Processes in Japan and Korea"
2000–2004 "Comparative and Empirical Study of Interest Groups and Civil Society Organizations focusing Primarily on Contemporary China"
1996–1998 "A Comparative and Empirical Study on Changes in Government and Interest Group Sector in Japan and Korea"
1995–2002 "A Comparative and Empirical Analysis of Environmental Policy Network in Japan, the United States, Germany, and Korea"
1993–1995 "A Comparative Statistical Analysis of the Formation and Change in Interest Groups in Advanced Countries"

Major Publications in English

English Language Books
2017　Yutaka Tsujinaka, Hiroaki Inatsugu.   Aftermath: Fukushima and the 3.11 Earthquake (Japanese Society).  Trans Pacific Press
2017 Timur Dadabaev, Murod Ismailov, Yutaka Tsujinaka Social Capital Construction and Governance in Central Asia Palgrave Macmillan US
2016 Sae Okura, Leslie Tkach-Kawasaki, Yohei Kobayashi, Manuela Hartwig, and Yutaka Tsujinaka"Analysis of the Policy Network for the “Feed-in Tariff Law” in Japan: Evidence from the GEPON Survey." Journal of Contemporary Eastern Asia vol15.World Association for Triple hElix and Future strategy studies
2015 Yutaka Tsujinaka, Shakil Ahmed, and Yohei Kobashi "Constructing Co-Governance between Government and Civil Society: An Institutional Approach to Collaboration."Edited by Ishtiaq Jamil, Salahuddin M. Aminuzzaman, Sk. Tawfique M. Haque Governance in South, Southeast, and East Asia:Trends, Issues and Challenges Springer 
2015 Edited by Fahimul Quadir with Yutaka Tsujinaka Civil Society in Asia: In Search of Democracy and Development in BangladeshRoutledge
2014 Edited by Robert J. Pekkanen, Steven Rathgeb Smith, and Yutaka TsujinakaNonprofits and Advocacy: Engaging Community and Government in an Era of RetrenchmentThe Johns Hopkins University Press
2014 Robert J. Pekkanen, Yutaka Tsujinaka, and Hidehiro YamamotoNeighborhood Associations and Local Governance in JapanRoutledge
2012 Robert Pekkanen, Yuko Kawamoto, and Yutaka Tsujinaka "Civil Society and the Triple Disasters: Revealed Strengths and Weaknesses" pp. 78–93 Edited by Jeff KingstonNatural Disaster and Nuclear Crisis in Japan: Response and Recovery after Japan's 3/11 Routledge
2010 Yutaka Tsujinaka "Civil Society and Social Capital in Japan" pp. 252–259Edited by Helmut Anheier and Stefan ToeplerInternational Encyclopedia of Civil SocietySpringer
2008 Robert Pekkanen and Yutaka Tsujinaka"Neighbourhood Associations and the Demographic Challenge" pp. 707–720Edited by F. Coulmas, H. Conrad, A. Schad-Seifert, and G. VogtThe Demographic Challenge: A Handbook about JapanBrill
2008 Yutaka Tsujinaka "Japan's Internal Security Policy" pp. 76–103Edited by Peter J. KatzensteinRethinking Japanese Security: Internal and External DimensionsRoutledge
2003 Yutaka Tsujinaka "From Developmentalism to Maturity: Japan's Civil Society Organizations in a Comparative Perspective" pp. 83–115Edited by Frank J. Schwartz and Susan J. Pharr The State of Civil Society in JapanCambridge University Press
1996 David Knoke, Frantz Urban Pappi, Jefferey Broadbent, and Yutaka Tsujinaka Comparing Policy Networks: Labor Politics in the U.S., Germany, and JapanCambridge University Press
1995 Peter J. Katzenstein and Yutaka Tsujinaka '"Bullying", "Buying", and "Binding": US-Japanese Transnational Relations and Domestic Structures"' pp. 79–111Edited by Thomas Risse-KappenBringing the Transnational Relations Back In: Non-State Actors, Domestic Structures and International InstitutionsCambridge University Press
1993　Yutaka Tsujinaka　 "Rengo and Its Osmotic Networks" pp. 200–213　Edited by Gary D. Allison and Yasunori Sone　 Political Dynamics in Contemporary Japan Cornell University Press
1991 Peter J. Katzensein and Yutaka Tsujinaka  Defending the Japanese State: Structures, Norms and the Political Responses to Terrorism and Violent Social Protest in the 1970s and 1980s Cornell University Press

Regular Articles
2013 Yutaka Tsujinaka, Shakil Ahmed, and Yohei Kobashi    "Constructing Co-governance between Government and Civil Society: An Institutional Approach to Collaboration"   Public Organization Review
2012 Kazuko Kojima, Jae-Young Choe, Takafumi Ohtomo, and Yutaka Tsujinaka   "The Corporatist System and Social Organizations in China"   Management and Organization Review 
2007 Yutaka Tsujinaka, Jae-Young Choe, and Takafumi Ohtomo   "Exploring the Realities of Japanese Civil Society through Comparison"   ASIEN
2007 Yutaka Tsujinaka and Robert Pekkanen  "Civil Society and Interest Groups in Contemporary Japan"  Pacific Affairs

Miscellaneous
2016 Yutaka Tsujinaka and Hiroomi Abe  "Social Capital and Citizen Satisfaction in Associational Perspective: Analyzing Urban Governance in Japan"
2005 Yutaka Tsujinaka "Chinese Civil Society Organisations from the Comparative Perspective: Civil Society Organisations Research (JIGS) 6-Country Comparison"
2005 Yutaka Tsujinaka, Robert Pekkanen, and Takafumi Ohtomo "Civil Society Groups and Policy-Making in Contemporary Japan"
2002 Yutaka Tsujinaka   "The Cultural Dimension in Measuring Social Capital: Perspective from Japan"

References

External links
 Yutaka Tsujinaka official homepage

1954 births
Living people
Osaka University alumni
Academic staff of the University of Tsukuba
Japanese political scientists